Manuela Berchtold (born 27 May 1977) is an Australian freestyle skier, who represented Australia at the 2002 and 2006 Winter Olympics.

She competed in the women's moguls and placed 27th in 2002. She was hampered by injuries between Olympics and had a knee reconstruction. In 2006, she came 16th in the qualifying round to make the finals, where she came 14th. She then retired.

References

Australian female freestyle skiers
Olympic freestyle skiers of Australia
Freestyle skiers at the 2002 Winter Olympics
Freestyle skiers at the 2006 Winter Olympics
Living people
1977 births